Mercy Amba Ewudziwa Oduyoye ( Yamoah; born 21 October 1934) is a Ghanaian Methodist theologian known for her work in African women's theology. She is currently the Director of the Institute of African Women in Religion and Culture at Trinity Theological Seminary, Ghana.

Biography:  Birth 
Mercy Amba Ewudziwa Oduyoye was October 21, 1934, in Brong Asante Village (Chidilli, 12) the eldest of nine children of Charles Kwaw Yamoah and Mercy Yaa Dakwaa Yamoah on her grandfather's cacao farm on Amoanna, near Asamankese, Ghana, in October 1934.  The name Ewudziwa is of Akan origin and was given to her in honour of her grandfather. Her family was from the Akan ethnic group. Her father was an ordained Methodist minister and teacher who eventually became the third President of the Conference Methodist Church in Ghana from 1973-1977. Her mother graduated from Wesley Girls School and was an activist and leader in her own right for the liberation of women and children in the church. Oduyoye said that she lives out of her "Christianized Akan background."  Amba means born on Saturday and Eudziwa after my grandfather, Kodwo Ewudzi.

Education 
Oduyoye attended Mmofraturo, a Methodist girl boarding school in Kumasi, Ghana, where Biblical scholarship was a required study. [8] In 1959, Oduyoye went to the University of Ghana to study theology. However, at the time, it was not a popular subject for many university undergraduates, especially for women, and she felt alone when she decided to pursue it. Later on, she realized that many African women studied theology as they went on to pursue master's and further studies in the field. For her, African Women's theology means, "we are African, we are women, and we are a theologian."[9] She eventually completed her Bachelor of Theology from the University of Ghana in 1963, and continued to Cambridge University for her second BA (1965) and MA (1969), both in theology. [9]
After she finished her studies at Cambridge, Oduyoye taught at Princeton Theological Seminary, in the 1960s, then Harvard University, Union Theological Seminary, and the University of Ibadan in the 1970s.[10] She is currently Director of the Institute of Women in Religion and Culture at Trinity Theological Seminary, Legon. [11]
Along with her academic posts, Oduyoye worked for several ecumenical organizations. She worked for the World Council of Churches, first as youth education secretary (1967–1979), then as Deputy General Secretary (1987-1994). From 1970-1973, she worked as the All Africa Conference of Churches (AACC) Youth Secretary at the Ibadan office.[1] She served as president of the World Student Christian Federation and founded the Circle of Concerned African Women Theologians in 1989. [13][14]
Oduyoye has been awarded honorary degrees by the University of Amsterdam (1991), Stellenbosch University (2009),[2] the University of the Western Cape (2002),[3] and Yale University (2008).[4] [dead link]

After she finished her studies at Cambridge, Oduyoye taught at Princeton Theological Seminary, in the 1960s, then Harvard University, Union Theological Seminary, and the University of Ibadan in the 1970s. She is currently Director of the Institute of Women in Religion and Culture at Trinity Theological Seminary, Legon. 

Along with her academic posts, Oduyoye worked for a number of ecumenical organizations. She worked for the World Council of Churches, first as youth education secretary (1967–1979), then as Deputy General Secretary (1987-1994). From 1970-1973, she worked as the All Africa Conference of Churches' (AACC) Youth Secretary at the Ibadan office. She served as president of the World Student Christian Federation and founded the Circle of Concerned African Women Theologians in 1989. 

Oduyoye has been awarded honorary degrees by University of Amsterdam (1991), Stellenbosch University (2009), the University of the Western Cape (2002), and Yale University (2008).

African Women's theology 
As a young girl, concepts such as gender and motherhood began shaping her into a young woman. Oduyoye talks about the importance of matrilineal kinship in her Ghanaian upbringing where women held a vital part in their family, passing down their names. However, later on, she was married into a patrilineal kinship by her Nigerian husband as a part of the Yoruba culture but had no children. She did not experience the effects of gender binary because, she suggests, she and her brothers all helped around the house without separation of tasks. Therefore, gender construction was a new element to Oduyoye because it never existed in her household. Although, the main difference she remembers is how the firstborn in African families, the eldest daughter was unmistakably "the second mother." In this sense, cultural practices became one of the main issues for Oduyoye to criticise in her later years. As big as her family was, all children went to post-secondary education, and some trained as nurses.

In 1948, Oduyoye experienced the atmosphere of Ghana's independence as Ghana boycotted European goods. Her sense of Pan-Africanism increased. For President Kwame Nkrumah, "...Ghana's Independence meant nothing if the rest of Africa was not Independent." This quote inspired Oduyoye's work because she saw liberation as intrinsic to African Women's Theology. Furthermore, the ways Europe subjugated Ghana's wealth contradicted Oduyoye's experiences on her grandfather's Cacao farm of an interconnected economy. Also, marriage in African culture interconnects with wealth. The most leading case for polygamy in Africa, is connected to successful men, economically. 

During Oduyoye's period of teaching in the United States, she realised that "people who wrote about Africa and Christianity in Africa, were not Africans" and were all men, having only "male face in mind." She experienced the Black liberation theology movement and found that "liberation theology became my theology voice." However, liberation theology was not sensitive to feminist issues, especially for African women. She saw issues of sexuality that feminists in the western world stressed as not applicable to African women. In the USA, Alice Walker and Mary Daly raised awareness of genital mutilation as a primary concern for all women. Contrary to this, Oduyoye says that woman's theology from the African perspective underlines poverty and discrimination upon women. Secondly, the problem for Oduyoye was Westerners only report about the good works of the missionaries and their benefit upon the population of Africa, all too good to be true. She disrupts the above narrative and insists Africans have a culture and tradition non-conformative to western ideals. For Oduyoye, "the Bible is not British culture or French culture or European culture." Her work around African women's theology sought to improve what African men had started. Theology in Africa was a two-winged theology, where men and women were making the appropriate improvement together, narrating two necessary viewpoints. The approach missionaries had on converting a person to Christianity by giving up one's culture seemed inappropriate. Oduyoye saw the need to revitalise African theology as "...a prerequisite to other independences."

Christianity and indigenous cultures 
The Africa continent is a multi-religious context, with many Muslims, Christians, Buddhists, Hindus, and Sikhs. Furthermore, many African indigenous cultures such as the Yoruba or the Akan emphasize strong gendered roles. These aspects of African culture can be reinforced within Christianity. Oduyoye sees the need to hold African churches accountable as she emphasises men and women as having equal status before God. Hence, in marriage, contracts should not be looked upon which party benefits but a live a life of the partnership. Oduyoye sees the need to re-evaluate African indigenous cultures because she sees colonialism as a system that interfered with them, such as martial law by the British in Lagos 1864. Oduyoye encourages women not to remain quiet but realise they hold the brick in forming churches in their communities. She seems theology in Africa outside the western interpretation because both men and women play a role in the body of Christ which is the Church.

Oduyoye implicitly offers a cultural criticism akin to postcolonial theology, which aims to challenge Western norms based on indigenous cultural thinking. In the 1981 assembly of Ecumenical Association of Third World Theologians in New Delhi, India, Oduyoye addressed what she termed as "irruption within the irruption. For her, gender division has taken root in the Global South inspired by colonial structures. Oduyoye uses the trait of hospitality and sisterhood to help people in the Global South deal with the effects of shared oppressions. In a way, when countries in the Global South help one another, they act in genuine solidarity because they share the same experiences. Collaboration is a dream that can help achieve impactful achievement. Oduyoye leaves the legacy of doing something where it is needed. She shows the role of confidence and sophistication that lies in individuals to chase after in changing the world as they see it fit.

Works
'Reflections from a Third World Woman's Perspective: Women's Experience and Liberation Theologies', in Irruption in the Third World the Challenge to Theology (1983)
Hearing and Knowing: Theological Reflections on Christianity in Africa Eugene, Or.: Wipf and Stock Publishers, 1986. , 
'Women and Ritual in Africa' in The Will to Arise: Women, Tradition, and the Church in Africa (1992)
'Feminist Theology in an African Perspective' in Paths of African Theology (1994)
Daughters of Anowa: African Women and Patriarchy Maryknoll, NY Orbis Books 1999. , 
Introducing African Women's Theology Cleveland: The Pilgrim Press, 2001. , 
Beads and Strands: Reflections of an African Woman on Christianity in Africa Maryknoll, New York : Orbis Books, 2004. ,

References

Notes

Bibliography

Further reading 
 
 

Living people
1934 births
Ghanaian feminists
Ghanaian Methodists
Ghanaian theologians
Methodist theologians
21st-century Protestant theologians
University of Ghana alumni
Alumni of the University of Cambridge
Harvard University faculty
Academic staff of the University of Ibadan
Women Christian theologians
Christianity in Africa
Chicago Theological Seminary alumni
20th-century Protestant theologians
World Christianity scholars
Christian feminist theologians
Black feminism